...And Star Power is the fourth studio album by American indie rock duo Foxygen, released October 14, 2014 through Jagjaguwar. It is a double album that follows a loose concept around the eponymous fictional band Star Power.

Unlike their previous full-length, the album was recorded almost entirely at home and in various locations in Los Angeles, such as the Chateau Marmont and Beverly Hills Hotel.

Track listing
Pitchfork released the track listing on July 30, 2014.

Personnel
Foxygen
Sam France – vocals, guitar, drums, piano, horns
Jonathan Rado – guitar, bass guitar, keyboards, piano, drums

References

2014 albums
Foxygen albums
Jagjaguwar albums
Concept albums
Albums produced by Jonathan Rado